The Port of Mongla is a link sea port, located at Mongla Upazila, Khulna Division, Bangladesh.It is a sea port of Khulna city which is located near 
to the north. It is the second largest and second busiest seaport of Bangladesh. Mongla port lies close to the shore of Bay of Bengal and Pashur river. Mongla is renowned among the major important ports of the Bengal delta. Due to the increasing congestion in Bangladesh's largest port in Chittagong, many international shipping companies have turned to Mongla as an alternative. Also the influence of continuous demanding from all over the country and neighbouring countries made it busier and economically eye catching day by day.

Also some political and economical influence in Khulna region from the government also prevailing the development and demand the port Mongla. Padma Bridge megaproject is a big example of those influence in Khulna region. Mongla is also a gateway for tourist ships traveling to the largest mangrove forest of world, the Sunderbans. It is also marked as a resource of UNESCO World Heritage Site. The port also hosts the Mongla Export Processing Zone (Mongla EPZ).

History

The port was founded in 1950 to serve the southwestern region of East Bengal. It was originally known as Chalna Port.

Geography
The Port is surrounded and protected by the Sundarban mangrove forest. The port is situated at the confluence of the Pasur River and the Mongla River.
.

Port infrastructure
The port has 11 jetties and 8 warehouses. It uses 12 swinging moorings in deeper sections in the river. The port is connected by the Bangladesh Railway to the Khulna Metropolitan Area.

Ship services
In 2015–16, 636 ships used Mongla port. Mongla is connected to most major ports in the world, particularly Asian ports. Hundreds of ships use the port each year, most of which come via Singapore, Hong Kong and Colombo. Mongla is also connected to most inland ports in Bangladesh, including the Port of Dhaka and the Port of Narayanganj.

Trade

The port is open for 24 hours and up to 225 metre long ships can enter into the port for discharging cargo. A constraint free large channel is available for anchorage and loading/unloading facilities on both sides for 33 ships at a time.

Future expansion
The government of Bangladesh has launched dredging and jetty construction projects to expand the capacity of Mongla port.

See also
 Countries dependent on the Bay of Bengal

References

Mongla
Bay of Bengal